The 2013–14 Dartmouth Big Green men's basketball team represented Dartmouth College during the 2013–14 NCAA Division I men's basketball season. The Big Green, led by fourth year head coach Paul Cormier, played their home games at Leede Arena and were members of the Ivy League. They finished the season 12–16, 5–9 in Ivy League play to finish in a tie for sixth place.

Roster

Schedule

|-
!colspan=9 style="background:#00693E; color:#FFFFFF;"| Regular season

References

Dartmouth Big Green men's basketball seasons
Dartmouth
Dart
Dart